Big Bar is an unincorporated community in Trinity County, California, United States.  The ZIP Code is 96010. The community is inside area code 530.

History
Established in 1849, Big Bar was one of the first settled areas in the county. It has had a post office operating since 1850.

Climate

Government
In the state legislature, Big Bar is in the 4th Senate District, represented by Republican Doug LaMalfa, and in the 1st Assembly District, represented by Democrat Patty Berg.

See also
Trinity County, California

References

External links

Unincorporated communities in Trinity County, California
Unincorporated communities in California